Bally Manufacturing, later renamed Bally Entertainment, was an American company that began as a pinball and slot machine manufacturer, and later expanded into casinos, video games, health clubs, and theme parks. It was acquired by Hilton Hotels in 1996. Its brand name, and mid-20th century pinball & slot machine logo, are still used by several businesses with some trademark rights, most notably Bally Technologies and Bally's Corporation.

History
The Bally Manufacturing Corporation was founded by Raymond Moloney on January 10, 1932, when Bally's original parent, Lion Manufacturing, established the company to make pinball games. The company took its name from its first game, "Ballyhoo". The company, based in Chicago, quickly became a leading pinball maker. In the late 1930s, Moloney began making gambling equipment, and had great success developing and improving the mechanical slot machines that were the core of the nascent gaming industry. After manufacturing munitions and airplane parts during World War II, Bally Manufacturing Corporation continued to produce innovations in flipperless pinball machines, bingo machines, payout machines and console slot machines through the late 1950s. They also designed and manufactured vending machines and established a coffee vending service. They made a brief venture into the music business with their own record label, Bally Records.

Moloney died in 1958, and the company floundered briefly. With the financial failure of its parent company, Bally was bought out by a group of investors in 1963. Throughout the 1960s, Bally continued to dominate the slot machine industry, cornering over 90% of the worldwide market by the end of the decade. In 1964, Bally introduced the first electromechanical slot machine, "Money Honey." They became a publicly traded company, and in 1969 acquired Midway Manufacturing, an amusement game company from Schiller Park, Illinois.

1970s
The company expanded internationally in 1974 when it acquired German company Guenter Wulff-Apparatebau, which was renamed Bally Wulff.

In the late 1970s, Bally entered the casino ownership business when New Jersey legalized gambling in Atlantic City. The effort moved forward even though the company was temporarily unable to attain a permanent license for the completed casino. During this period, company head William T. O'Donnell was forced to resign because of alleged links to organized crime, which he strenuously denied. When questioned by the Moffitt Royal Commission in New South Wales, Australia, during an investigation of criminal activities between the US and Australia, O'Donnell admitted that Genovese Mafia boss Gerardo Catena once owned shares in Bally but claimed to have bought him out. He also denied knowing Chicago mobster Joseph Dan Testa, even though Australian police described Testa "as a representative of Bally who visited Australia." The company opened the Park Place Casino & Hotel on December 29, 1979. 

During the late 1970s and early 1980s, Midway, which was renamed Bally/Midway after Bally's legacy pinball business was consolidated with it, became a primary source of income for Bally as it became an early arcade video game maker and obtained licenses for three of the most popular video games of all time: Space Invaders, Pac-Man, and Ms. Pac-Man.

Also in the late 1970s, Bally/Midway also made an entry into the growing market for home video games with the Bally Professional Arcade. It had advanced features for the time, including a palette of 256 colors and the ability to play 4-voice music. It shipped with a cartridge that allowed users to do a limited amount of programming on the machine themselves, using the BASIC language and record their programs on cassette tape. However, because it cost more than its main competitor, the Atari 2600 and had far fewer games it failed to compete successfully despite a loyal following.

1980s
By the mid-1980s, Bally again had a strong balance sheet and began buying other businesses, including the Six Flags amusement park chain, and the Health and Tennis Corporation of America, which became Bally Total Fitness, both bought in 1983, and a lottery terminal company, Scientific Games, in 1986. That same year, Bally's also purchased several casinos, including the original MGM Grand Hotel and Casino on the Las Vegas Strip (subsequently rebranded Bally's Las Vegas and now the Horseshoe Las Vegas); the MGM Grand in Reno (now Grand Sierra Resort); and the Golden Nugget Atlantic City, rebranded Bally's Grand (most recently the Atlantic Club Casino Hotel). The expansion quickly took its toll on the company's finances, and Bally was soon forced to sell off several divisions, including Six Flags and Bally/Midway, which was acquired by longtime pinball and video game rival Williams Electronics in 1988.

1990s
In 1990, Bally came under new management as its largest shareholder, Arthur Goldberg, was appointed chairman and began a restructuring process. Needing to pay down debts, Bally Wulff, the German subsidiary, was spun off into an independent company in 1991. Scientific Games, exercise equipment maker Life Fitness, and the Reno casino were sold in 1993. The slot machine manufacturing division was spun off as Bally Gaming International as well, ending the company's involvement in manufacturing. The Aladdin's Castle chain of video arcades was sold that year to Namco and renamed Namco Cybertainment.

The company opened Bally's Saloon & Gambling Hall, a riverboat casino in Mhoon Landing, Mississippi in December 1993. It was moved to Robinsonville in 1995 and became part of a joint venture with Lady Luck Gaming.

In 1994, the company changed its name to Bally Entertainment, to reflect its focus on the casino business and the fact that it no longer had any manufacturing operations. It also announced that the health club business would be spun off to shareholders, to further narrow Bally's focus on casinos. The spin-off was completed in January 1996, with Bally Total Fitness becoming a separate company.

In June 1996, Bally Entertainment agreed to be acquired by Hilton Hotels Corporation. The sale was completed on December 18, 1996, with Hilton paying $3 billion ($2 billion in stock plus $1 billion in assumed debt). Two years later, Hilton's casino division, including the former Bally properties, was spun off as Park Place Entertainment, named for the address of Bally's Atlantic City. In 1999, Park Place bought Caesars World, and in 2003 changed its name to Caesars Entertainment. It was acquired in 2005 by Harrah's Entertainment, which took the name Caesars Entertainment Corp in 2010, and was eventually acquired in 2020 by Eldorado Resorts, to become the current incarnation of Caesars Entertainment.

Legacy of the name

Many casinos and businesses worldwide have used the Bally name and logo in the maze of ownership, division spin-offs and licensing agreements.

Williams, after acquiring the Bally/Midway amusement games unit, continued to use the Bally name for pinball games, until Williams's parent company WMS Industries ceased pinball production in 1999. WMS Industries has licensed compamies to use the intellectual properties and the rights to remanufacture existing Bally and Williams pinball machines. Since 2014, the license has been held by Planetary Pinball Supply.

Alliance Gaming, which bought Bally Gaming International in 1996, changed its name to Bally Technologies in 2006. It was purchased in 2014 by Scientific Games, which had also acquired WMS Industries the prior year. The company, which changed its name to Light & Wonder in 2022, continues to use Bally Technologies as a subsidiary manufacturing video slot machines and other casino equipment.

Bally Total Fitness, burdened with debt from over-expansion and declining revenues after the 2008 recession, began selling off its clubs in the 2010s. Sales of large numbers of clubs to LA Fitness in 2011, Blast Fitness in 2012, and 24 Hour Fitness in 2014, along with closures of other clubs saw the chain dwindle. The last Bally Total Fitness club closed in October 2016. The Bally Total Fitness name had been used under license for a line of fitness equipment and clothing owned by FAM Brands, which acquired the name outright in 2013.

The rights to use the name for casinos were sold by Caesars in October 2020 to Twin River Worldwide Holdings, which then changed its own name to Bally's Corporation and said that it would rename most of its properties under the Bally's brand. In a related transaction, Bally's Corporation acquired Bally's Atlantic City from Caesars. In January 2022, Caesars announced that Bally's Las Vegas, which they retained, would be rebranded as the Horseshoe Las Vegas following a renovation.

Bally's Corporation reached a 10-year naming rights agreement with Sinclair Broadcast Group to rebrand the Fox Sports Network group of regional sports networks, which Sinclair had recently acquired, as Bally Sports, beginning in 2021.

Former subsidiary Bally Wulff remains a gaming and vending equipment manufacturer in Germany, with additional operations in Spain. French gambling equipment distributor Bally France and Japanese arcade distributor Bally Pond also still use the Bally logo, though have no current relation to any other business with the name.

References

1932 establishments in Illinois
1996 disestablishments in Illinois
American companies established in 1932
American companies disestablished in 1996
Amusement companies of the United States
Pinball manufacturers
Slot machine manufacturers
Defunct manufacturing companies based in Chicago